Winner is an upcoming film directed by Susanna Fogel with a screenplay by Kerry Howley, and is a biopic of Reality Winner, played by Emilia Jones.

Synopsis
The film is based on the life of Reality Winner who leaked an intelligence report about Russian interference in the 2016 United States elections.

Cast
 Emilia Jones as Reality Winner
 Annelise Pollmann as young Reality
 Kathryn Newton as Brittany Winner
 Averie Peters as young Brittany
 Connie Britton as Billie Winner
 Zach Galifianakis as Ron Winner
 Danny Ramirez as Andre

Production
Described as a darkly comedic biopic, Emilia Jones was confirmed to be portraying the whistle-blower Reality Winner from a script written by Kerry Howley based on her own 2017 New York Magazine feature, "Who Is Reality Winner?," with Fogel also on board to direct. In October 2022 it was confirmed that principal photography had started with Connie Britton and Zach Galifianakis playing Winner’s parents and Kathryn Newton her sister. It marks the second collaboration between Fogel and Jones following Cat Person. Filming started around the areas in Winnipeg and Manitoba, and was wrapped in November 21, 2022.

References

External links
 

Upcoming films
2020s English-language films
Upcoming English-language films
Films about whistleblowing
Films shot in Canada
Films shot in Manitoba
Films shot in Winnipeg